Omar Hassan is a professional skateboarder from Costa Mesa, California. He has competed in numerous competitions, including the X Games.

He is sponsored by PRO-TEC, Black Label, Independent Trucks, Vans, Quiksilver, Ford, and Black Flys.

References

American skateboarders
X Games athletes
Living people
American people of Lebanese descent
Year of birth missing (living people)
People from Costa Mesa, California
Sportspeople from Orange County, California
Sportspeople of Lebanese descent